Jan Novak (born 4 October 1997) is a Slovenian professional footballer who plays for NK Trebnje as a forward. He is a product of the NK Krka youth system and represented Slovenia at U18 level.

Club career

NK Krka 
A forward or winger, Novak began his career in his native Slovenia with NK Krka in 2004. He rose through the youth ranks to make his professional debut for the club at 16 years of age, with a late appearance as a substitute for Martin Kramarič in a 3–1 PrvaLiga defeat to NK Rudar Velenje on 23 August 2014. Despite scoring prolifically for the youth teams, it wasn't until after relegation to the Second League that Novak made a breakthrough into the first team, making 18 appearances and two goals during the first half of the 2016–17 season before departing the Portoval on 31 January 2017.

Brentford 
During the 2016–17 pre-season, Novak travelled to England to join the B team at Championship club Brentford on trial. He was successful, but paperwork problems meant that he was unable to join the club until 31 January 2017, when he signed an 18-month contract for an undisclosed fee. Novak made 32 appearances and scored six goals before his release at the end of the 2017–18 season.

Return to Slovenia 
On 22 August 2018, Novak returned to Slovenia to rejoin Second League club NK Krka on a one-year contract and made 26 appearances and scored five goals during the 2018–19 season. Upon the expiration of his contract on 1 July 2019, he joined Second League club NK Drava Ptuj on a free transfer. Novak made 18 appearances and scored two goals during the truncated 2019–20 season and transferred back to NK Krka on 7 August 2020. He made just three appearances and transferred to Ljubljana Regional League club NK Trebnje during the 2021–22 off-season.

International career 
Novak won four U18 caps for Slovenia in 2014.

Career statistics

References

External links 
 Jan Novak at nzs.si

1997 births
Living people
Slovenian footballers
Association football forwards
Association football wingers
Slovenian expatriate footballers
Slovenian expatriate sportspeople in the United Kingdom
Expatriate footballers in England
Slovenian PrvaLiga players
NK Krka players
NK Drava Ptuj players
Brentford F.C. players